The 2017 Trophée des Champions was the 22nd edition of the Trophée des Champions, the annual super cup in France. The match was contested by the 2016–17 Ligue 1 champions Monaco, and the 2016–17 Coupe de France champions Paris Saint-Germain. The match was played at the Stade Ibn Batouta in Tangier, Morocco.

Paris Saint-Germain were the four-time defending champions, having defeated Lyon 4–1 in the 2016 edition, which was played in Austria.

Paris Saint-Germain won the match 2–1 for their seventh Trophée des Champions title.

Match

Summary
Djibril Sidibé opened the scoring for Monaco in the 30th minute when he ran through on goal before clipping the ball past the advancing goalkeeper Alphonse Areola from just outside the penalty area with his right foot. Dani Alves equalised in the 51st minute, scoring with his right foot from a free-kick which went over the wall and into the top left corner from over 25 yards out. Adrien Rabiot got the winning goal in the 63rd minute when he headed into the net from six yards out after a cross from the right from Dani Alves.

Details

See also
 2016–17 Ligue 1
 2016–17 Coupe de France

References

External links
  

2017–18 in French football
2017–18 in Moroccan football
2017
International club association football competitions hosted by Morocco
AS Monaco FC matches
Paris Saint-Germain F.C. matches
Sport in Tangier
July 2017 sports events in Africa